

Here is presented a listing of the National Register of Historic Places in Black Hawk County, Iowa.

The list is intended to give a complete review of the properties and districts on the National Register of Historic Places in Black Hawk County, Iowa, United States. Latitude and longitude coordinates are provided for many National Register properties and districts; these locations can be seen on an online map.

There are 49 properties and districts listed in the National Register of the county. Four properties were once listed, but have since been removed.

Current listings

|}

Former listings

|}

See also

 List of National Historic Landmarks in Iowa
 National Register of Historic Places listings in Iowa
 Listings in neighboring counties: Benton, Bremer, Buchanan, Butler, Fayette, Grundy, Tama

References

 
Black Hawk
Buildings and structures in Black Hawk County, Iowa